Roughly speaking, in decision theory, game theory, and rational choice, menu dependence arises when the evaluation of alternatives for choice or the mode of selection guiding choice varies parametrically with what collection of alternatives is available for choice (i.e., with what "menu" or decision problem a decision maker is facing).  Menu dependence can be accompanied by violations of various so-called consistency (or coherence) constraints, such as Sen's condition α (also known as Chernoff's Axiom, a contraction condition) and Sen's conditions γ and β (expansion conditions).   While the phenomenon can arise in a variety of ways, menu dependence is often informally associated with a change in a decision maker's preferences among alternatives with the addition of irrelevant alternatives.

See also 
 Decoy effect
 Predictably Irrational, book by Dan Ariely

Further reading

Applied mathematics
Decision theory